Brian Tomlinson (22 August 1940 – 30 June 2022) was an Australian rules footballer who played with South Melbourne in the Victorian Football League (VFL). He played for Warrandyte Football Club in the Eastern Football League before and after his stint at South Melbourne.

Notes

External links 

1940 births
2022 deaths
Australian rules footballers from Victoria (Australia)
Sydney Swans players